AEN Ayiou Georgiou Vrysoullon-Acheritou is a Cypriot football club based in Ayios Georgios Vrysoullon, Cyprus. The team has played once in the Third Division and four times in the Fourth Divion/STOK Elite Division. It participated once in the Cypriot Cup for lower divisions in 2012–13, losing in the semi-finals to ENTHOI Lakatamia FC who were also in the Fourth Division.

History
The team was founded in 2004 by the merging of Olympos Acheritou and Dynamo Acheritou.

Olympos Acheritou was a Cypriot club founded in 1959 in Acheritou, located in the Famagusta District, currently under the de facto control of Northern Cyprus. After the Turkish invasion of Cyprus in 1974, Olympos moved to the Agios Georgios (refugee settlement). They played 7 times in Cypriot Fourth Division before the 2004 merger. It also participated in the 1987–88 and 1989–90 Cypriot Cups.

Record

References

External links

 Team profile at Cyprus Football Association website  

Football clubs in Cyprus
Association football clubs established in 2004
2004 establishments in Cyprus